Closeburn (Scottish Gaelic: Cill Osbairn) is a village and civil parish in Dumfries and Galloway, Scotland. In the 2001 census, Closeburn had a population of 1,119. Closeburn is recorded as Killosbern in 1185. The first element of the name is Gaelic cill 'cell or church'. The second element is a saint's name, but none has definitely been identified.

Between 1849 and 1961 the village had a railway station.  Although Closeburn railway station is now closed, the Glasgow South Western Line still runs through the village.  The nearest stations are at Sanquhar and Dumfries.

The village is the former location of Wallace Hall Academy, founded in 1723 and now based in Thornhill.  The former schoolhouse, built in 1795 and incorporating the original buildings from the 1720s, is a Category A listed building.

The River Nith is on the western boundary of the parish of Closeburn. The eastern part of the parish contains several hills, including the  Queensberry, at the southern end of the Lowther Hills, part of the Southern Uplands.

The nearby Brownhill Inn was a favourite haunt of the poet Robert Burns whilst he was working at an excise man or gauger in the area and was the site of inspirational events that led to the bard writing several poems, odes, etc. John Bacon was the landlord immortalised in verse by Burns and his wife was Catherine Stewart whose parents had run the Closeburn Kirk Brig Inn. Her brother was Willie Stewart who was the factor or grieve of the Closeburn Castle estate.

Notable residents
John Bacon was a friend of Robert Burns, a vintner and landlord at the Brownhill Inn.
Prof John Hunter FRSE LLD, joint founder of the Royal Society of Edinburgh, born here in 1746.
James Williamson, church minister, mathematician and joint founder of the Royal Society of Edinburgh was minister here in 1757.

See also
 List of listed buildings in Closeburn, Dumfries and Galloway
 Dalgarnock Village, Church and Parish
 Barburgh Mill, Closeburn

References

External links

Brownhill Inn
Video footage and tales of the Closeburn churches.
Video footage of the 11th century Dalgarnock Kirk site and burial ground
'Crichope Linn - Devil's Cauldron, Burley's Leap and the Souter's Seat.

Civil parishes of Scotland
Villages in Dumfries and Galloway
Parishes in Dumfries and Galloway